Hinche is an arrondissement in the Centre department of Haiti. As of 2015, the population was 264,943 inhabitants. Postal codes in the Hinche Arrondissement start with the number 51.

The arondissement consists of the following communes:
 Hinche
 Cerca-Cavajal
 Maïssade
 Thomonde

References

Arrondissements of Haiti
Centre (department)